Saxon Rice (born 15 June 1976) is an Australian Liberal National politician who was the member of the Legislative Assembly of Queensland for Mount Coot-tha from 2012 to 2015, having defeated Deputy Premier and Treasurer Andrew Fraser at the 2012 state election. She was appointed Assistant Minister for Technical and Further Education on 3 April 2012.

Rice has a Master of International Law from the Australian National University and a Bachelor of Economics from Sydney University.

References

1976 births
Living people
Liberal National Party of Queensland politicians
Members of the Queensland Legislative Assembly
University of Sydney alumni
Australian National University alumni
21st-century Australian politicians
Women members of the Queensland Legislative Assembly
21st-century Australian women politicians